The 2004–05 Lega Basket Serie A season, known as the Serie A TIM for sponsorship reasons, was the 83rd season of the Lega Basket Serie A, the highest professional basketball league in Italy.

The regular season ran from October 3, 2004 to May 2005, 18 teams played 34 games each. The top 8 teams made the play-offs whilst the lowest ranked team, Sicc Cucine Jesi and the bankrupt club Scavolini Pesaro, were relegated to the Legadue.

Climamio Bologna won their second title by winning the playoff finals series against Armani Jeans Milano.

Regular Season 2004/05 

Teams marked in green qualified for the playoffs. Teams marked in red were relegated to Serie A2. Scavolini Pesaro has gone bankrupt after the season and moved to Serie B, sparing Reggio Calabria relegation.

Playoffs 

Quarterfinals
 Benetton Treviso - Pompea Napoli 3-0 (94-75, 86-75, 86-73)
 Climamio Bologna - Sedima Roseto 3-0 (95-84, 77-72, 73-70)
 Lottomatica Roma - Montepaschi Siena 3-1 (88-86, 82-78, 79-85, 87-78)
 Armani Jeans Milano - Vertical Vision Cantù 3-0 (83-77, 92-83, 94-83)

Semifinals
 Armani Jeans Milano - Benetton Treviso 3-2 (60-82, 58-49, 61-80, 69-58, 61-57)
 Climamio Bologna - Lottomatica Roma 3-1 (78-64, 65-76, 80-61, 63-62)

Finals
 Climamio Bologna - Armani Jeans Milano 3-1 (77-70, 66-73, 80-71, 67-65)

Individual leaders 

Statistics are for the regular season.

Scoring

Assists

Rebounds

See also 
LBA

Lega Basket Serie A seasons
1
Italy